Bryn Evans (born 28 October 1984) is a New Zealand rugby union player, who currently plays as a lock for the  in Super Rugby and  in New Zealand's National Provincial Championship competition.

Club career
Evans was born in Hastings and attended high school in Napier. He was accepted into the New Zealand Secondary Schools team in 2005. The following year, he made his provincial debut for Hawke's Bay in the Air New Zealand Cup.

In 2008, Evans signed with the Blues in the Super 14. For the 2009 season, he switched to the Wellington-based Hurricanes.

Evans joined English club London Irish in 2011 on a two-year contract. The All Black second row was one of numerous international players to join the club in 2011. On 10 June 2014, Evans joined French club Biarritz Olympique in the Pro D2 league.

On 21 May 2015, Evans returned to England to sign for Sale Sharks on a two-year contract. He left Sale at the end of his contract on 30 June 2020.

On January 3, 2020, he was named in the English Premiership team of the decade, following successful spells at London Irish and Sale.

International career
Evans earned his first startup for the All Blacks in 2009, making his debut against France in June. He played two tests against France, before a back injury forced him to pull out for the rest of the international mid-year season, as well as the 2009 Air New Zealand Cup.

References

External links
 

1984 births
Living people
People educated at Napier Boys' High School
New Zealand rugby union players
Rugby union players from Hastings, New Zealand
New Zealand international rugby union players
Hawke's Bay rugby union players
Hurricanes (rugby union) players
Blues (Super Rugby) players
Highlanders (rugby union) players
London Irish players
Biarritz Olympique players
Sale Sharks players
Rugby union locks
New Zealand expatriate rugby union players
New Zealand expatriate sportspeople in England
New Zealand expatriate sportspeople in France
Expatriate rugby union players in England
Expatriate rugby union players in France